Monica Scattini (1 February 1956 – 4 February 2015) was an Italian actress.  Films Scattini appeared in include Maniaci sentimentali,  for which she won a David di Donatello for Best Supporting Actress, and  Lontano da dove, for which she was awarded with a Nastro d'Argento for Best Supporting Actress.  Her television credits include Un ciclone in famiglia and Recipe for Crime. She also appeared in the films Nine, Le Bal, One from the Heart, and Nora 

Scattini died of cancer on 4 February 2015, aged 59.

She was the daughter of director Luigi Scattini.

Filmography

Films

Television

References

External links

2015 deaths
Italian film actresses
Italian television actresses
Nastro d'Argento winners
David di Donatello winners
1956 births
Deaths from cancer in Lazio
People of Piedmontese descent
People of Tuscan descent